"Like a Motorway" is a song by British pop group Saint Etienne. The song combines the melody from the nineteenth century folk song "Silver Dagger" with a driving techno beat influenced by Kraftwerk and Snap!. It describes a friend whose lover has mysteriously vanished.

"Like a Motorway" appears on their third album, Tiger Bay (1994). It was released as a single in May 1994, and reached #47 on the UK Singles Chart. The US release of Tiger Bay also features an "alternate version" with more complex percussion and electric guitar stings. It also appears on the original soundtrack for the 1994 film, Speed, although the single is never heard in the actual film itself.

The cover art for the single features an abandoned car overgrown with foliage. The video consists of a long, slow zoom in Sarah Cracknell as she sings against a black background, intercut with occasional rapid shots of Pete Wiggs and Bob Stanley in a car.

Critical reception
Dave Thompson from AllMusic described the song as "mysteriously Kraftwerk-ian". Another editor, Tim Sendra, named it "one of Saint Etienne's best songs". Larry Flick from Billboard felt it "has a nice sing-along chorus. Sarah Cracknell uses her girlish, light voice well, and has grown into a polished front person..." He also noted its "gauzy softness", adding, "DJs will dig the rhythm foundation with its rapid, Giorgio Moroder-esque pattern, though single is also the act's best bet to date for a top 40 breakthrough." Jim Wirth from NME called it "teutonic". Neil Spencer from The Observer declared it as a "chart contender" and "disco slick".

Track listing
All tracks written and composed by Stanley and Wiggs; except where indicated.

Charts

References

1994 singles
Saint Etienne (band) songs
Songs written by Bob Stanley (musician)
Songs written by Pete Wiggs
1994 songs
Heavenly Recordings singles